Eduardo Vasconcelos Stadium, also known as Estadio de Béisbol Lic. Eduardo Vasconcelos, is a stadium in Oaxaca, Oaxaca, Mexico. It is primarily used for baseball, and is the home field of the Guerreros de Oaxaca Liga Mexicana de Béisbol baseball team since the team entered the league in 1996. It currently holds 6,011 spectators.

The stadium opened in 1950 as the home for the athletics department for the Universidad Autónoma Benito Juárez de Oaxaca. It is named after Eduardo Vasconcelos, who was Governor of Oaxaca from 1947 to 1950.  The stadium's playing surface is FieldTurf. A remodeling prior to the 2008 season brought the stadium a new video board and improved seats in charge of the Mexican architectural firm Broissin architects.

References

External links
Stadium information
Liga Mexicana de Béisbol: Los Guerreros de Oaxaca, el debut en la liga mejicana
History and stadium information

Sports venues in Oaxaca
Sports venues completed in 1950
Guerreros de Oaxaca
Mexican League ballparks
1950 establishments in Mexico